

sum-sup

sumacetamol (INN)
sumarotene (INN)
sumatriptan (INN)
sumetizide (INN)
Sumycin 
sunagrel (INN)
suncillin (INN)
sunepitron (INN)
sunitinib (INN, USAN)
Supartz
Supeudol
supidimide (INN)
Suplasyn
suplatast tosilate (INN)
Supprelin 
Suppress
Suprane 
Suprax 
Suprefact 
suproclone (INN)
suprofen (INN)

sur-sux

suramin sodium (INN)
Sureprin 81
Surfak
surfomer (INN)
Surgam
Surgicel
suricainide (INN)
suriclone (INN)
surinabant (INN, USAN)
Surital 
suritozole (INN)
Surmontil 
suronacrine (INN)
Survanta 
Sus-Phrine Sulfite-Free 
susalimod (INN)
Suspen
Sustaire 
Sustiva 
sutezolid (USAN)
sutilains (INN)
suvizumab (INN)
suvorexant (USAN)
suxamethonium chloride (INN)
suxemerid (INN)
suxethonium chloride (INN)
suxibuzone (INN)

sy
Symadine 
Symbyax 
symclosene (INN)
symetine (INN)
Symmetrel 
Synacort 
Synagis
Synalar 
Synalgos-DC 
Synarel 
Syncurine 
Synercid 
Synkayvite 
Synophylate 
Synovalyte 
Synphasic
Synthroid 
Syntocinon 
Syprine 
syrosingopine (INN)
Sytobex